Charles Butterworth may refer to:

 Charles Butterworth (philosopher) (born 1938), American political philosopher
 Charles Butterworth (actor) (1899–1946), American actor